Smokowo  is a village in the administrative district of Gmina Kętrzyn, within Kętrzyn County, Warmian-Masurian Voivodeship, in northern Poland.

The village has a population of 435.

References

Smokowo